Middle Village is the name of several areas:

In the United States
 Middle Village, Queens, in New York City 
 Middle Village – Metropolitan Avenue (BMT Myrtle Avenue Line), a subway station in Middle Village
 Station Camp, or Middle Village, a historical site on the Columbia River that is part of Lewis and Clark National Historical Park
 Middle Village, Michigan, a historic village located in modern-day Readmond Township, Michigan
 Middle Village, Wisconsin

In other countries
Places that mean "Middle Village" in other languages include:
 Medelby (Germany, Sweden and Finland)
 Ortaköy, Nicosia (Cyprus) 
 Ortaköy (Turkey)
 Chaupimarca (Peru)